The Valea Cheii (also: Cheia, in its upper course also: Rudărița) is a left tributary of the river Dâmbovița in Romania. Its source is in the Leaota Mountains. It flows into the Dâmbovița downstream from Podu Dâmboviței.

Tributaries

The following rivers are tributaries to the river Valea Cheii (from source to mouth):

Left: Prepeleac, Valea Crovului, Valea Pereților, Valea Bunii, Valea Strâmbă
Right: Urdărița, Valea Furneciului

References

Rivers of Romania
Rivers of Argeș County